Trouble is the second album by the British pop group Sailor, formed in 1973 and best known in the 1970s for their hit singles "A Glass of Champagne" and "Girls, Girls, Girls" (both featured on this album), written by the group's Norwegian lead singer and 12-string guitar player, Georg Kajanus. The album reached #45 in the UK charts.

Track listing

All words and music by Georg Kajanus

Side 1
"Girls, Girls, Girls" – 3:02
"Trouble in Hong Kong"  – 3:07
"People in Love"  – 3:29
"Coconut"  – 2:24
"Jacaranda"  – 2:15

Side 2
"A Glass of Champagne" – 2:41
"My Kind of Girl"  – 3:01
"Panama"  – 3:25
"Stop That Man"  – 3:05
"The Old Nickelodeon Sound"  – 2:56

Personnel
Sailor
Grant Serpell - drums, percussion, vocals
Phil Pickett - bass nickelodeon, guitarron, piano, vocals
Henry Marsh - nickelodeon, accordion, piano, marimbas, vocals
Georg Kajanus - 12-string guitars, charango, Veracruzana harp, lead vocals

Production

Produced by: Jeffrey Lesser
Associate Producer: Rupert Holmes
Recorded at: CBS Studios, London (October 1975)
Mastering Engineer: Arun Chakraverty
Album Design: Roslav Szaybo (CBS Records)
Photography: Peter Lavery

Charts

Weekly charts

Year-end charts

References

1975 albums
Epic Records albums